Kaka Nunatak is the most prominent of the Kea Nunataks, rising to about  near the center of the group. Kaka Nunatak is one of several features near Mount Bird assigned the name of a New Zealand mountain bird, in this case the "kaka". It was named by the New Zealand Geographic Board in 2000.

References

Nunataks of Ross Island